The Niagara River Lions are a Canadian professional basketball team based in St. Catharines, Ontario, that competes in the Canadian Elite Basketball League. From 2015 to 2018, they were members of the National Basketball League of Canada. The River Lions play their home games at the Meridian Centre in downtown St. Catharines.

History 
In February 2014, the Niagara Basketball Group started the application process to get a local team. Over a year later, the NBL Canada announced that they would hold a press conference on the morning of April 8, 2015, regarding the expansion team. The group also held an online contest in which fans had the opportunity to make suggestions as to what the team's nickname should be. On May 14, 2015, the NBL held a Board of Governors' meeting, in which it was approved and confirmed that Niagara would compete in the 2015–16 season. At a press conference on May 28, 2015, it was announced that the team would be called the "Niagara River Lions," a nickname inspired by the Niagara Region's coat of arms, which depicts the same animal. Ken Murray, a successful Canadian Interuniversity Sport (CIS) coach, came out of retirement to claim the head coaching and general manager (GM) position. However, during their inaugural season, Murray was fired from the team on February 20, 2016, and was replaced by assistant coach Grâce Lokole. Lokole would step down from the head coach position during the next season on March 11, 2017. He was replaced by local Niagara College head coach Keith Vassell on an interim basis while Lokole stayed on as an assistant. Joe Raso would be named the head coach for the 2017–18 season.

In 2017, River Lions' owner Richard Petko became one of the investors of a new basketball league called Canadian Elite Basketball League (CEBL). On June 8, 2018, the River Lions announced that the franchise had moved to the CEBL  after three seasons in the National Basketball League of Canada.

Mascot 
For their first season, the River Lions announced that their mascot would be Dunkin the River Lion. Dunkin performs during every River Lions home game and attends events throughout the Niagara Region.

NRL Dance Pak
The NRL Dance Pak is the official dance team for the Niagara River Lions coached by Tiffany Byron and Maggie Campbell. They act as ambassadors for the River Lions organization by engaging and entertaining fans at all home basketball games and community events throughout the Niagara region.

Players

Current roster

Season-by-season record

Notable players
 Khalil Ahmad
 Javin DeLaurier
 Stephen Maxwell
 Xavier Moon

References

External links 
 Official website

 
National Basketball League of Canada teams
Basketball teams in Ontario
2015 establishments in Ontario
Basketball teams established in 2015
Canadian Elite Basketball League teams